John Franklin Sheridan (June 11, 1869 – November 24, 1943) was an American actor of the silent and early sound film eras.

Biography

Born in Boston, he began acting later in life, at the age of 46, and had several leading roles. As time went on, he segued into the character actor role and continued working right into his 70s. Although mostly in smaller roles, he continued to enjoy featured roles occasionally throughout the 1930s, as in his role of Sam Stubener in the 1936 film Conflict, which starred John Wayne.

In 1926, Sheridan married Catherine T. McNulty, who died in 1943. Later that same year, he married Edna M Carroll and they had one child. Frank Sheridan died on November 24, 1943, in Hollywood, aged 74.

Filmography

(Per AFI database)

An * denotes a featured or starring role.

 At Bay  (1915) as District Attorney Graham*
 The Money Master (1915) as John Haggleton*
 The Perils of Divorce  (1916) as John Graham*
 The Struggle  (1916) as Major James Carewe*
 Enlighten Thy Daughter  (1917) as Daniel Stevens*
 Vengeance Is Mine  (1917) as Peter Van Brunt*
 Ruler of the Road  (1918) as Hugh Tomlinson*
 A Daughter of Two Worlds  (1920) as Black Jerry Malone*
 Anne of Little Smoky  (1921) as "The" Brockton*
 Her Lord and Master (1921) as Fred Stillwater*
 The Rider of the King Log (1921) as John Xavier Kavanagh*
 One Exciting Night  (1922) as The Detective
 The Man Next Door (1923) as Curley*
 Two Shall Be Born (1924) as Dominick Kelly*
 Lena Rivers  (1925) as Henry Rivers Grahme Jr.*
 Fast Life  (1929) as Warden*
 Side Street  (1929) as Mr. O'Farrell*
 Danger Lights  (1930) as Ed Ryan*
 The Other Tomorrow  (1930) as Dave Weaver*
 Ladies of the Big House  (1931) as Warden Hecker*
 The Public Defender  (1931) as Charles Harmer*
 The Flood  (1931) as David Bruce Sr.*
 Silence  (1931) as Joel (Alva) Clarke*
 Young Donovan's Kid  (1931) as Father Dan*
 Murder by the Clock  (1931) as Chief of Police
 A Free Soul  (1931) as Prosecuting Attorney (uncredited)
 Broken Lullaby  (1932) as Priest
 Washington Merry-Go-Round  (1932) as Kelleher
 The Roadhouse Murder  (1932) as District Attorney
 The Last Mile  (1932) as Warden Frank Lewis*
 Okay, America!  (1932) as Police Commissioner
 Afraid to Talk  (1932) as Police Commissioner
 Deception  (1932) as  Leo
 The Man Who Dared: An Imaginative Biography  (1933) as Senator John McGuinness*
 The Woman Accused  (1933) as Inspector Swope
 Mama Loves Papa  (1933) as The Mayor
 Speed Demon  (1933) as Captain Torrance*
 The Cat's-Paw  (1934) as Police Commissioner Dan Moriarity*
 Stand Up and Cheer!  (1934) as Senator
 Upper World  (1934) as Inspector Kellogg
 Wharf Angel  (1934) as The Captain
 The Witching Hour  (1934) as Chief of Police
 The Merry Widow  (1934) as Judge
 The Whole Town's Talking  (1935) as Russell
 The Revenge Rider  (1935) as Jed Harmon*
 The Spanish Cape Mystery  (1935) as Walter Godfrey*
 Front Page Woman  (1935) as Warden
 Frisco Kid  (1935) as Mulligan
 Whispering Smith Speaks  (1935) as Gordon D. Harrington Sr.*
 Death Flies East  (1935) as Warden
 Men Without Names  (1935) as Police Captain
 West Point of the Air  (1935) as General Debbin
 Nevada  (1935) as Tom Blaine
 The Payoff  (1935) as George Gorman
 His Night Out  (1935) as Detective
 Woman Wanted (1935) as Judge
 The Best Man Wins  (1935) as Captain of the salvage tug
 Murder with Pictures  (1936) as Police Chief
 Country Gentlemen  (1936) as Chief of Police
 Missing Girls  (1936) as Prison Warden
 The Little Red Schoolhouse  (1936) as Warden Gail
 Conflict  (1936) as Sam Stubener*
 The Voice of Bugle Ann  (1936) as Nathan
 San Francisco  (1936) as Founders' Club Member (uncredited)
 The Leavenworth Case  (1936) as Silas Leavenworth*
 The Life of Emile Zola  (1937) as M. Van Cassell
 Parnell  (1937) as Sheriff (uncredited)
 The Great O'Malley  (1937) as Father Patrick
 Maytime  (1937) as Committeeman
 Woman in Distress  (1937) as Inspector Roderick
 A Fight to the Finish  (1937) as Warden
 City Streets  (1938) as Father Ryan*
 Secrets of a Nurse  (1938) as Warden
 Heroes in Blue  (1939) as Mike Murphy*
 Black Friday  (1940) as Chaplain

References

External links

1869 births
1943 deaths
American male silent film actors
20th-century American male actors
Male actors from Boston